Glushkovsky District is an administrative and municipal district (raion), one of the twenty-eight in Kursk Oblast, Russia. It is located in the west of the oblast. Its administrative center is the urban locality (a work settlement) of Glushkovo. Population:  28,147 (2002 Census);  The population of Glushkovo accounts for 23.9% of the district's total population.

Geography
Glushkovsky District is located in the south-west of Kursk Oblast on the border with Ukraine.  The district lies on the Central Russian Upland; the terrain is a hilly plain averaging 200 meters above sea level.  The area is dominated by the meandering floodplain of the Seym River, which runs east to west through the middle of the district on its way to the Desna River and ultimately the Dnieper River.  The Seym River floodplain is 2.5-4.0 km wide, and the river valley is 7-12 km wide; the southern side is flatter.

The district is 120 km southwest of the city of Kursk, and 530 km southwest of Moscow.  The area measures 22 km (north-south), and 40 km (west-east).  The administrative center is the town of Glushkovo.

The district is bordered on the north by Rylsky District, on the east by Korenevsky District, on the south and west by Ukraine.

References

Notes

Sources

External links
Glushkovsky District on Google Maps
Glushkovsky District on OpenStreetMap

Districts of Kursk Oblast